Robin Leonard Trower (born 9 March 1945) is an English rock guitarist who achieved success with Procol Harum throughout 1967–1971, and then again as the bandleader of his own power trio known as the Robin Trower Band.

Biography 
Robin Trower was born in Catford, London, England, and grew up in Southend-on-Sea, Essex. In 1962, he formed a band that became the Paramounts, later including Westcliff High School pupil Gary Brooker. The Paramounts disbanded in 1966 to pursue individual projects. During this time, Trower created a local three-piece band called the Jam (not to be confused with the later group with Paul Weller). Trower then joined Brooker's new band Procol Harum following the success of their debut single "A Whiter Shade of Pale" in 1967, remaining with them until 1971 and appearing on the group's first five albums.

Before launching his eponymous band, he joined singer Frankie Miller, ex-Stone the Crows bassist/singer James Dewar, and former Jethro Tull drummer Clive Bunker to form the short-lived combo Jude. This outfit did not record and soon split up.

Trower retained Dewar as his bassist, who took on lead vocals as well, and recruited drummer Reg Isidore (later replaced by Bill Lordan) to form the Robin Trower Band in 1973. In 1974, the group released Bridge of Sighs. This album, along with his first and third solo albums, was produced by his former Procol Harum bandmate, organist Matthew Fisher. His early power trio work was noted for Jimi Hendrix influences.
Trower is an influential guitarist who has inspired other guitar legends such as Robert Fripp, who praised him for his string bending and the quality of his sounds, and took lessons from him.

In the early 1980s, Trower teamed up with former Cream bassist Jack Bruce and his previous drummers Lordan and Isidore for two albums, BLT (Bruce, Lordan, Trower) and Truce (Trower, Bruce, Isidore). After those albums, he released another album with James Dewar on vocals titled Back It Up in 1983. Robin Trower was dropped from Chrysalis Records afterwards.

Trower was also a part of the Night of the Guitars II European tour in 1991, organized by Sting and The Police manager Miles Copeland. The tour featured Ronnie Montrose, Rick Derringer, Saga's Ian Crichton, Dave Sharman, Jan Akkerman and Laurie Wisefield.

Thirteen albums later, Trower's album Living Out of Time (2004) featured the return of veteran bandmates Dave Bronze on bass, vocalist Davey Pattison (formerly with Ronnie Montrose's band Gamma) and Pete Thompson on drums—the same line-up as the mid-1980s albums Passion and Take What You Need.

With the same bandmates, Trower gave a concert on his 60th birthday in Bonn, Germany. The concert was recorded by the German television channel WDR. It was then released on DVD and subsequently on CD throughout Europe and later the US under the title Living Out of Time: Live. Trower toured the United States and Canada in the summer and autumn of 2006.

In 2007, Trower released a third recording with Jack Bruce, Seven Moons, featuring Gary Husband on drums. A 2008 world tour began in Ft. Pierce, Florida, on 16 January 2008. Joining Davey Pattison and Pete Thompson was Glenn Letsch (formerly of Gamma) playing bass. European dates began in April. The show of 29 March 2008 at the Royal Oak Music Theater in Royal Oak, Michigan, was released as a double album on V12 Records.

Trower has described James Brown as his "big hero", particularly Brown's early work "where blues is crossing over into rock and roll".

In 2016, he enjoyed a successful tour of the US. On 20 March 2018, Trower played a show at the Maryland Hall for the Creative Arts in Annapolis, Maryland. Ten minutes later (approximately 9:00PM EDT) after playing back-to-back songs "Day of The Eagle" and "Bridge of Sighs", he announced on his microphone that he was not feeling well (he had flu symptoms), handed his guitar to a stage crew, walked backstage and collapsed. He was transported by ambulance to the hospital for treatment.

In 2019, it was announced that Trower had signed to Mascot Label Group, alongside the announcement of a new studio album Closer To The Day. Regarding the album's title, he told Guitar World, "I'm not thinking about dying — far from it. What I'm saying is, 'If I'm nearer the end than the beginning, then I've got to get going.'" The album was released on 22 March 2019, while its supporting tour was canceled as a result of the COVID-19 pandemic.

On 18 February 2022, Trower announced his latest studio album, No More Worlds To Conquer, alongside its title track. The record was released on 29 April 2022.

Equipment 

During a 1971 tour with Jethro Tull, Robin Trower arrived early for a sound check and found Martin Barre's Fender Stratocaster (which Barre used for slide playing) propped up against an amplifier. Trower picked up the guitar, plugged it in, and with a shout that resounded around the auditorium he yelled, "This is it!" "I then switched to Strat" he says. "Up to then I had been playing Les Pauls."
Since then Trower has been an ongoing proponent of the Fender Stratocaster. He currently uses his custom-built Strat (made by the Fender Custom Shop) which comes in black, white, and burgundy. The guitar is equipped with a 1950s reissue pick-up in the neck position, a 1960s reissue in the middle position, and a Texas Special at the bridge. Other features included a custom C-shaped maple neck featuring a large headstock with a Bullet truss-rod system, locking machine heads and a maple fingerboard with narrow-spaced abalone dot position inlays and 21 jumbo frets. The Strats he plays live are an exact model of his signature guitar, which is entirely unmodified. For his first two albums, his guitar was tuned in Standard Tuning EADGBE. Starting from the third album, he detuned the strings a semitone to an Eb Tuning (Eb Ab Db Gb Bb Eb). It is reported that during live performances, his guitar is tuned a full step down to a DGCFAD tuning. This long-established practice of detuning may have been prompted by his preference for very heavy-gauge guitar strings. Trower's three top strings (high E, B and G) measure  .012", .015" and .017". By comparison, the most common choice of rock-and-roll lead players is .009", .011", .015". The width and weight of Trower's string set are similar to common acoustic guitar strings, and that weight makes vibrating and bending the strings more difficult, especially with the full tension of a standard tuning. Detuning them a half-step or more lower eases the tension and provides greater control. Trower told Guitar Player Magazine in a July 1980 interview that he recommends every young player try a thicker set of strings. "The thicker sound alone is worth it, but they also help keep you from forming bad habits."

Trower uses between one and three 100-watt Marshall heads with four to six cabinets on stage. While he usually uses two JCM 800s and a JCM 900, he also links 100-watt Marshall Plexi heads. In studio sessions, Trower uses a mix of amplifiers, such as a Fender Blues Junior and Cornell Plexi Amplifiers models to acquire different tonality.

He has recently been using Fulltone pedals and effects. He favors the OCD, Distortion Pro, Fat Boost, CLYDE Deluxe Wah, Deja Vibe 2, Soul-Bender, and a BOSS Chromatic Tuner. He runs his Deja Vibe into his distortion pedal to get his famous tone. He was given his own signature Fulltone Robin Trower Overdrive in late 2008.

For his 2009 and 2011 US tours Trower was using his Fender Custom Shop Signature Stratocaster into a Fulltone Deja Vibe 2, Fulltone Wahfull, Fulltone Clyde Standard Wah, Fulltone Full Drive, Fulltone Robin Trower Overdrive, and Boss TU-2 Chromatic Tuner into two Marshall Vintage Modern 2466 heads.

On his 2018 tour he used the same gear but through two 50 watt Marshall Plexi Reissue Heads, the 1987X.

Discography

With Procol Harum 
 1967  Procol Harum
 1968  Shine on Brightly (Trower sings backup on "Wish Me Well")
 1969  A Salty Dog (Trower sings lead on "Crucifiction Lane")
 1970  Home
 1970  Ain't Nothin' to Get Excited About (a vintage rock'n'roll side-project by members of Procol Harum, recording as 'Liquorice John Death')
 1971  Broken Barricades (Trower sings lead on "Song for a Dreamer" and "Poor Mohammed")
 1991  The Prodigal Stranger
 1995  The Long Goodbye

With Robin Trower Band

Studio albums

Live albums 

 1976: Robin Trower Live! (recorded 2/3/75, Stockholm) – UK #15, US #10, AUS #73 SWE #40 CAN #52
 1985: Beyond the Mist (recorded April 1985 at The Marquee Club, London)
 1992: BBC Radio 1 Live in Concert (recorded 1/29/75)
 1996: King Biscuit Flower Hour Presents Robin Trower in Concert (recorded 10/18/77, New Haven, CT)
 1999: This Was Now '74–'98 (recorded 1974, Pittsburgh, PA; 1998, Seattle, WA) -2-CD set
 2006: Living Out of Time: Live (recorded 9/3/05, Bonn, Germany) [note: also available on DVD]
 2009: RT@RO.08 (recorded 3/29/08, Royal Oak, MI)
 2011: Robin Trower at The BBC 1973–1975 (recorded 3/26/73 [John Peel Session], 9/26/73 [Bob Harris Session], 2/20/74 [Bob Harris Session], 3/5/74 [John Peel Session], 1/28/75 [John Peel Session], and 1/29/75 [BBC Radio 1 Live in Concert, omitting 2 songs but adding 2 others]) -2-CD set
 2013: State To State: Live Across America 1974–1980 (recorded 1974, Philadelphia; 1974, California; 1976, Illinois; 1977, Oklahoma; 1980, Missouri) -2CD
 2015: Rock Goes To College 1980 (recorded 2/25/80, London)

Compilations 
 1987: The Robin Trower Portfolio
 1991: Essential Robin Trower
 1991: Robin Trower: The Collection
 1994: Robin Trower Anthology
 2002: Speed Of Sound: The Best of Robin Trower
 2004: Dreaming the Blues -2-CD set
 2008: Day of The Eagle: The Best of Robin Trower
 2010: A Tale Untold: The Chrysalis Years 1973–1976 -3-CD set
 2012: Farther On Up The Road: The Chrysalis Years 1977–1983 -3-CD set
 2014: Compendium 1987–2013 -2-CD set
 2014: Original Album Series (contains Twice Removed from Yesterday, Bridge of Sighs, For Earth Below, Robin Trower Live!, Long Misty Days) -5-CD set
 2015: Original Album Series, Vol. 2 (contains In City Dreams, Caravan to Midnight, Victims of the Fury, B.L.T., Truce) -5-CD set
 2019: The Studio Albums 1973–1983 (contains all 10 Chrysalis studio albums presented in card-sleeves housed in a clamshell box) -10-CD set

With Jack Bruce 
 1981: B.L.T. – US #37
 1982: Truce – US #109
 1989: No Stopping Anytime (compilation of B.L.T. and Truce)
 2007: Seven Moons
 2009: Seven Moons Live (recorded 2/28/09, Nijmegen, Holland) [note: also available on DVD] re-released as Songs from the Road

With Bryan Ferry 
 1993: Taxi
 1994: Mamouna
 2007: Dylanesque

References

External links 

 
 Robin Trower albums to be listened on Spotify
 Robin Trower songs & albums to be listened on YouTube
 Robin Trower profile, NPR.org
 "Funky" Paul Olsen's album cover artwork for Robin Trower, OlsenArt.com

1945 births
Procol Harum members
Living people
English rock musicians
20th-century British guitarists
21st-century British guitarists
Blues rock musicians
English rock guitarists
Lead guitarists
Musicians from Essex
Chrysalis Records artists
Atlantic Records artists
The Paramounts members